Ekbal Miya is a Nepalese politician and was  Minister of Youth and Sports of Government of Nepal since 4 June 2021 but was removed from the post by Supreme Court on 22 June 2021. He started his political life in 2043 BS from ANNFSU but in 2073 BS he joined he joined the then Terai Madhes Loktantrik Party , became a central committee member of Rastriya Janata Party Nepal and is currently a People's Socialist Party, Nepal leader. 

He was Elected as a member of the House of Representatives from Bara 4 (constituency) in  2017 Nepalese general election.

See also 
Second Oli cabinet
 Ministry of Youth and Sports (Nepal)
 Bara 4 (constituency)

References

Government ministers of Nepal
Living people
People from Bara District
Nepal MPs 2017–2022
1969 births
Communist Party of Nepal (Unified Marxist–Leninist) politicians
Terai Madhesh Loktantrik Party politicians
Rastriya Janata Party Nepal politicians
People's Socialist Party, Nepal politicians
Loktantrik Samajwadi Party, Nepal politicians